The Human Body EP is an EP by The Electric Soft Parade, released in 2005. The song "The Captain" is a bonus track on the U.S. release of the EP.

Track listing

Original release
 "A Beating Heart" – 3:07
 "Cold World" – 4:07
 "Stupid Mistake" – 2:42
 "Everybody Wants" – 6:55
 "Kick in the Teeth" – 2:55
 "So Much Love" – 1:45

U.S. release
 "A Beating Heart" – 3:07
 "Cold World" – 4:07
 "Stupid Mistake" – 2:42
 "Everybody Wants" – 6:55
 "The Captain" – 3:33
 "Kick in the Teeth" – 2:55
 "So Much Love" – 1:45

2005 debut EPs
The Electric Soft Parade albums
Truck Records EPs